Agnee is an Indian rock band based in Pune, India. The band's debut album "Agnee" was released on 15 May 2007. Since then, they have released several singles and used an Internet-based free distribution model. The band continues to use their 'Create with Agnee' venture in collaboration with Radio Mirchi.

History
Agnee was formed in 2007 by a banking executive turned musician Kannan Mohan and Kaustubh Dhavale(better known by his stage name Koco). The band was soon signed by Sony BMG. Agnee is one of the very few Indian rock bands to have signed a major label record deal. In 2012, the band composed the music for the Indian release of Marvel’s superhero film, The Avengers (2012).

Music
They have collaborated with the bass player Etienne Mbappe (from Cameroon) to work on a Punjabi song together.

References

External links

 
 

Indian rock music groups
Musical groups established in 2007
2007 establishments in Maharashtra